Marta Semelová (born 1 March 1960) is a Czech politician who served as a member of the Chamber of Deputies (MP) from 2010 to 2017, representing the Communist Party of Bohemia and Moravia. Before that, she had worked as a teacher of the first stage of primary school, chair of the Communist Party group of the Assembly of the City of Prague, and chair of the Prague council of the Communist Party.

References

External links
Mgr. Marta Semelová - Parliament of the Czech Republic 

1960 births
Communist Party of Bohemia and Moravia MPs
Czech educators
21st-century Czech women politicians
Living people
Politicians from Prague
Charles University alumni
Members of the Chamber of Deputies of the Czech Republic (2010–2013)
Members of the Chamber of Deputies of the Czech Republic (2013–2017)